Gorey railway station is a railway station in the town of Gorey, County Wexford, Ireland. It is on the Dublin–Rosslare line.

Services/routes

The service from the station is:

Monday to Friday
5 trains per day to Dublin Connolly  (one continuing to Dundalk Clarke departing Gorey at 0643hrs)
4 trains per day to Rosslare Europort
1 train per day to Wexford O'Hanrahan

Saturdays
4 trains per day to Dublin Connolly  (one continuing to Dundalk Clarke)
3 trains per day to Rosslare Europort

Sundays
3 trains per day to Dublin Connolly
3 trains per day to Rosslare Europort

Description

The station is staffed with a small waiting room and ticket office. Only Platform 1 (the platform nearest the entrance) is wheelchair-accessible.

It consists of two platforms, one on the down passing loop. There is a water tower, still used by occasional steam trains, at the north end of Platform 1. There is also a siding, formerly a loop, cut back to allow the platforms to be extended in early 2006. This is regularly used when there are engineering works on the line.

Most of the line from Dublin to Wexford and Rosslare is single track with passing loops at stations. When the signal box is open the loop can be used, otherwise trains use the main platform. Prior to the installation of mini-CTC on the line in April 2008, it was not normally possible for northbound trains to use the loop, as it was only signalled in the Rosslare direction. This led to some awkward shunting arrangements when a locomotive-hauled train terminated. The timetable suggests that only one train each way has to use of the loop.

The station's car park has an electric vehicle charging facility, with spaces for 2 EVs.

History
The station was opened on 16 November 1863.

In popular culture
The station is featured in the eponymous 1980s book of poetry, "Train to Gorey" by Liz O’Donoghue.

External links 

Irish Rail webpage of Gorey station

See also 
 List of railway stations in Ireland

References 

Iarnród Éireann stations in County Wexford
Railway stations in County Wexford
Railway stations opened in 1863
Gorey
1863 establishments in Ireland
Railway stations in the Republic of Ireland opened in the 19th century